Meprin A subunit alpha also known as endopeptidase-2 or PABA peptide hydrolase is the alpha subunit of the meprin A enzyme that in humans is encoded by the MEP1A gene. The MEP1A locus is on chromosome 6p in humans and on chromosome 17 in mice.

Function 

The meprin alpha subunit product of the MEP1A gene is processed in the endoplasmic reticulum during intracellular transport, and is secreted as homomeric meprin A.  Meprin alpha subunits may self-associate, and once secreted, form very large multimers, with a molecular mass of over 1 million daltons.  In cells concurrently expressing MEP1B, the meprin alpha and meprin beta subunits form disulfide dimers that interact to form membrane bound heterotetrameric meprin A.

References

Further reading